The Douglas World Cruiser (DWC) was developed to meet a requirement from the United States Army Air Service for an aircraft suitable for an attempt at the first flight around the world. The Douglas Aircraft Company responded with a modified variant of their DT torpedo bomber, the DWC.

Five aircraft were ordered for the round-the-world flight: one for testing and training and four for the actual expedition. The success of the World Cruiser bolstered the international reputation of the Douglas Aircraft Company. The design of the DWC was later modified to create the O-5 observation aircraft, which was operated by the Army Air Service.

Design and development
In 1923, the U.S. Army Air Service was interested in pursuing a mission to be the first to circumnavigate the earth by aircraft, a program called "World Flight". Donald Douglas proposed a modified Douglas Aircraft Company DT to meet the Army's needs. The two-place, open cockpit DT biplane torpedo bomber had previously been supplied to the Navy, thus shortening production time for the new series.  The DTs to be modified were taken from the assembly lines at the company's manufacturing plants in Rock Island, Illinois and Dayton, Ohio.  Douglas promised that the design could be completed within 45 days after receiving a contract.  The Air Service agreed and lent Lieutenant Erik Nelson, a member of the War Department planning group, to assist Douglas. Nelson worked directly with Douglas at the Santa Monica, California factory, to formulate the new proposal. 
 
The modified aircraft known as the Douglas World Cruiser (DWC), powered by a 420 hp Liberty L-12 engine, also was the first major project at Douglas for Jack Northrop. Northrop designed the fuel system for the series. The conversion involved incorporating a total of six fuel tanks in wings and fuselage. For greater range, the total fuel capacity went from 115 gallons (435 liters) to 644 gallons (2,438 liters). Other changes from the DT involved having increased cooling capacity, as well as adding two separate tanks for oil and water. To ensure a more robust structure, a tubular steel fuselage, strengthened bracing, a modified wing of 49 ft (15 m) wingspan and larger rudder were required. The dual cockpits for the pilot and copilot/crewman were also located more closely together with a cutout in the upper wing to increase visibility.

Like the DT, the DWC could be fitted with either floats or a conventional landing gear for water or ground landings. Two different radiators were available, with a larger version for tropical climes. After the prototype was delivered in November 1923, upon the successful completion of tests on 19 November, the Army commissioned Douglas to build four production series aircraft. Due to the demanding expedition ahead, spare parts, including 15 extra Liberty engines, 14 extra sets of pontoons, and enough replacement airframe parts for two more aircraft were specified and sent to way points along the route. The last aircraft was delivered on 11 March 1924.

Operational history

From 17 March 1924, the pilots practiced in the prototype which served as a training aircraft. On 6 April 1924, the four expedition aircraft, named Boston, Chicago, New Orleans and Seattle, departed Sand Point, Washington, near Seattle, Washington. Seattle, the lead aircraft, crashed in Alaska on 30 April.  The other three aircraft with Chicago assuming the lead, continued west across Asia and Europe relying on a carefully planned logistics system, including prepositioned spare engines and fuel caches maintained by the U.S. Navy and Coast Guard, to keep the aircraft flying. Boston was forced down and damaged beyond repair in the Atlantic, off the Faroe Islands.  The remaining two aircraft continued across the Atlantic to North America, where they were joined by Boston II at Pictou, Nova Scotia. The recently re-christened prototype continued with the flight back to Washington and on the World Flight's ceremonial flypast across the United States. The three surviving aircraft returned to Seattle on 28 September 1924. The flight covered 23,942 nm (44,342 km). Time in flight was 371 hours, 11 minutes and average speed, 70 miles per hour.

Manufacturer

After the success of the World Cruiser, the Army Air Service ordered six similar aircraft as observation aircraft, retaining the interchangeable wheel/float undercarriage, but with much less fuel and two machine guns on a flexible mounting in the rear cockpit. These aircraft were initially designated DOS (Douglas Observation Seaplane), but were redesignated O-5 in May 1924.

The success of the DWC established Douglas Aircraft Company among the major aircraft companies of the world and led it to adopt the motto "First Around the World – First the World Around". The company also adopted a logo that showed aircraft circling a globe, replacing the original winged heart logo.

Survivors

In returning to their starting point, during the ceremonial flight across the United States, when the aircraft made it to Chicago for a celebration attended by thousands, Lieutenant Smith, as the spokesman for the mission, addressed the crowd. Eddie Rickenbacker, the celebrated flying ace and chair of the welcoming committee, formally requested that the Chicago, as the mission flagship, remain in its host city, donated to the Field Museum of Natural History. Major General Mason M. Patrick, Chief of the Air Service, was on hand to accept the request, and promised its formal consideration.

Upon the request of the Smithsonian Institution, however, the U.S. War Department transferred ownership of the Chicago to the national museum. It made its last flight, from Dayton, Ohio to Washington, D.C., on 25 September 1925. It was almost immediately put on display in the Smithsonian's Arts and Industries Building. In 1974, the Chicago was restored under the direction of Walter Roderick, and transferred to the new National Air and Space Museum building for display in their Barron Hilton Pioneers of Flight exhibition gallery.

After 1925, the New Orleans was donated to the Los Angeles County Museum of Natural History. Beginning in 1957, the New Orleans was displayed at the National Museum of the United States Air Force in Dayton, Ohio. In 1988, it was transferred to the Museum of Flying, Santa Monica. The aircraft was on loan from the Los Angeles County Museum of Natural History and was returned in 2005. Since February 2012, the New Orleans is to be a part of the exhibits at the Museum of Flying, Santa Monica, California.

The wreckage of the Seattle was recovered and is now on display in the Alaska Aviation Museum. The original Boston sank in the North Atlantic, and it is thought that the only surviving piece of the original prototype, the Boston II, is the aircraft data plate, now in a private collection, and a scrap of fuselage skin, in the collection of the Vintage Wings & Wheels Museum in Poplar Grove, Illinois.

Reproduction aircraft
Bob Dempster of Seattle, Washington, built an airworthy reproduction Douglas World Cruiser, the Seattle II, powered by a restored Liberty engine, which made its maiden flight on 29 June 2016.  He plans to repeat the around-the-world flight in Seattle II, starting in April 2017.

Operator

United States Army Air Service

Specifications (DWC and DOS with wheels/floats)

McDonnell Douglas aircraft since 1920 : Volume I

See also

References

Notes

Citations

Bibliography

 Boyne, Walter J. The Aircraft Treasures Of Silver Hill: The Behind-The-Scenes Workshop Of The National Air And Space Museum. New York: Rawson Associates, 1982. .
 Bryan, Courtlandt Dixon Barnes. The National Air and Space Museum. New York: Harry N. Abrams, Inc., 1979. .
 Donald, David, ed. Encyclopedia of World Aircraft. Etobicoke, Ontario: Prospero Books, 1997. .
 Francillon, René J. McDonnell Douglas Aircraft Since 1920: Volume I. London: Putnam, 1979. .
 Haber, Barbara Angle. The National Air and Space Museum. London: Bison Group, 1995. .
 Mackworth-Praed, Ben. Aviation: The Pioneer Years.  London: Studio Editions, 1990. .
 Ogden, Bob. Great Aircraft Collections of the World. New York: Gallery Books, 1986. .
 Stoff, Joshua. Transatlantic Flight: A Picture History, 1873–1939. Mineola, New York: Dover Publications, Inc., 2000. .
 Swanborough, F. Gordon. and Peter M. Bowers. United States Military Aircraft since 1909. London: Putnam, 1963.
 Wendell, David V. "Getting Its Wings: Chicago as the Cradle of Aviation in America." Journal of the Illinois State Historical Society, Volume 92, No. 4, Winter 1999/2000, pp. 339–372.
 Will, Gavin. The Big Hop: The North Atlantic Air Race. Portugal Cove-St.Phillips, Newfoundland: Boulder Publications, 2008. .
 Yenne, Bill. Seaplanes & Flying Boats: A Timeless Collection from Aviation's Golden Age. New York: BCL Press, 2003. .

 Glines, Carroll V., Cohen, Stan. "The First Flight Around the World: A Pictorial History.", 2000 .

External links

 Carroll V. Glines, "Around the World", Air Force Magazine, Vol. 82, No. 9, September 1999
 Air Force Museum
 Centennial of Flight
 Smithsonian Institution 
 PBS documentaryChasing the Sun: Douglas Aircraft

Floatplanes
1920s United States experimental aircraft
Biplanes
Single-engined tractor aircraft
World Cruiser
Aircraft first flown in 1923